Andrew Hinds,  (born 25 April 1984) is a Barbadian sprinter who specializes in the 100 metres. His personal best times are 10.03 seconds for the 100 metres, and 20.38 seconds for the 200 metres — both were achieved in Bridgetown, Barbados.

He was a bronze medalist in the 200 meters at the 2006 Central American and Caribbean Games, a bronze medalist in the 100m at the 2009 Central American and Caribbean Championships, and a silver medalist in the 100m at the 2013 Central American and Caribbean Championships.

Hinds has represented Barbados at the 2008 Summer Olympics in Beijing, qualified for the 2012 Summer Olympics in London, and competed at the IAAF 2011 World Championships in Athletics, where he reached the semi finals.

His father Hadley Hinds is also an Olympian, having competed at the 1968 Summer Olympics in Mexico.

References

External links

1984 births
Living people
Barbadian male sprinters
Athletes (track and field) at the 2008 Summer Olympics
Olympic athletes of Barbados
Central American and Caribbean Games bronze medalists for Barbados
Competitors at the 2006 Central American and Caribbean Games
Central American and Caribbean Games medalists in athletics